Mary Ann Acevedo Rivera (born June 23, 1987), better known as Mary Ann, is a Puerto Rican singer and songwriter. She is known for being a contestant on the third season of Objetivo Fama (2006) and the first season of Idol Puerto Rico (2011). After her stint on Objetivo Fama, Acevedo was the first contestant of that season to release an album.

Life and music career

Biography
Mary Ann was born in Cabo Rojo, Puerto Rico, on June 23, 1987. She is the daughter of Ana M. Rivera Colón and Jesús Acevedo; and sister of Keitha Acevedo and Jesús Manuel Acevedo. Mary Ann, began singing at age 11 at her school and soon after became part of the TV show "A Toda Maquina" in which for three years entertained the audience with her voice and presence on stage.

Mary Ann married in December 2006, with the "merenguero" singer and former member of Grupo Kaos, Guillermo Torres. As a result of their marriage, (in 2010) Acevedo and Torres had a daughter named Anna Carolina Torres Acevedo.

In 2008, Mary Ann was honored by the Mexican gay community during the eighteenth "Parada de Orgullo de las Comunidades Lésbico, Homosexual, Bisexual, Transgénero y Transexual" (LGBT) in Puerto Rico. Acevedo received recognition in the "Parque del Tercer Milenio" in San Juan, while on her artistic presentation. She sang many songs, including "Débil" and "Si No Estas Aquí" when she was surprised by transgender diva "Samantha Love".

Like many international artists, in 2009 Mary Ann joined "RED", an organization that helps children with HIV in Africa. She was integrated with the stores "USA Baby – Child Space" and with each baby car purchased at the store, they will be donating a reasonable percent to RED. On June 1, 2009, Mary Ann and Guillermo announced on national television, at the program Anda Pa'l Cara, who are expecting their first child. Release long-awaited by fans of Mary Ann.

After more than two years of trying to get pregnant from her husband, she has seven weeks of gestation (June 2009). While confessing that he caused "terror" following the birth, Mary Ann wants to live the natural process, so you do not want to provide any medication to combat the pain. "I want you to hurt me and do whatever, take classes to prepare", said the youngest 21 years, who hopes not to have to undergo a caesarean section. Mary Ann Acevedo, who learned of her pregnancy last May 28, 2009 by a test home at the insistence of his sister, has designed the names that could bring his baby. If baby is named Maria Alejandra, while being male, as Guillermo Enrique baptize.

In December 2009, a newspaper in Puerto Rico reported that Mary Ann was not giving birth to her daughter at the Auxilio Mutuo Hospital, Hato Rey, Puerto Rico, as was published in other media. Her husband explained that it was only a false alarm, since Mary Ann felt great pain of contractions. According to Guillermo, the doctor applied to his wife medicines to ease the pain of contractions. The doctors gave him the news that his daughter can reach the world, sooner than expected.

On February 1, 2010, Mary Ann gave birth to her daughter, Anna Carolina, at the Auxilio Mutuo Hospital in San Juan. She measured 21 inches long and weighed 8 pounds. Mary Ann explained that the baby born healthy, both left the hospital on two days later. For Guillermo, the husband of Mary Ann, this is his sixth daughter; according to Guillermo, was very special because it is the first time attending the birth of a baby.

In midsummer 2011, press reports an alleged separation between Mary Ann and Guillermo Torres, which turned out to be true. After a reconciliation in August, other rumors about an alleged pregnancy began to have boom, while Mary Ann was involved in Idol Puerto Rico, but she denied it at the second gala of the reality show. However, in November, Mary Ann posted on his official Facebook page, she started the divorce proceedings to formalize their separation from Guillermo. Both made the decision seeking the best welfare of his daughter Anna Carolina.

In January 2012, Mary Ann announced her intention to return to college and complete studies she began in 2006 and then left to enter the competition Objetivo Fama. On January 24, Acevedo officially began their continued academic preparation for a Bachelor of General Music Education-Vocal at Interamerican University of Puerto Rico, San German Campus.

2006–2008: Objetivo Fama, Mary Ann, and Los Favoritos
Mary Ann was a contestant on the third season of Objetivo Fama 3, she came in fourth place. She became the first contestant to release her own CD in October 2006. After being part of the program Objetivo Fama, where her voice and presence captivated millions of viewers, Mary Ann gives us her first album which is self-titled (Mary Ann), which is already known to fans of this great competition for talent. With great security scenic Mary Ann was presented Saturday after Saturday before an audience of roughly 14 million inhabitants for a period of 4 months.

On Saturday, April 26, 2008, Mary Ann was presented in reality show, singing a duet with Cristina Eustace (winner of the Objetivo Fama Fifth Season) the song "Fuera De Mi Vida", and they were the most acclaimed of the night. Also on May 2, 2009, Mary Ann was presented at the last season of Objetivo Fama singing a duet with Hannaní Peraza, the song "Mírame" (first single of Mary Ann Acevedo's album).

Songs performed by Mary Ann in the reality show in 2006:
"El Frío de Tu Adiós" (Olga Tañon)
"Amar Sin Ser Amada" (Thalía)
"Como Tu Mujer" (Rocío Dúrcal)
"Bandolero" (Olga Tañon)
"Vivo Por Ella" (Andrea Bocelli and Marta Sánchez)
"Contigo En La Distancia" (Christina Aguilera)
"El Hombre Que Yo Amo" (Myriam Hernández)
"Si No Te Hubiera Conocido" (Luis Fonsi and Christina Aguilera)
"Que Ganas De No Verte Nunca Más" (Lupita D'Alessio)
"Héroe" (Mariah Carey)
"A Que Vuelve" (Gisselle)
"Si Tu No Estas Aquí" (Rosana)
"Tu si que sabes amar" (Rocío Dúrcal)
"Fuera de mi vida" (Valeria Lynch)

Her debut self-titled album ("Mary Ann") was produced by Italian record producer Bob Benozzo, and arranged by Sergio George, Eduardo Barreras and Eduardo Reyes. Her album genre is pop ballad, and the first single released was "Mírame". Her songs were played both in Puerto Rico and abroad. We can ensure that this CD is a gem from start to finish, simply put together this "dream team" of production, an excellent selection of topics and an interpreter who takes heart in throat, to know that we are facing a luminaire that soon will be singing the world. We can only invite them to enjoy "the new star of the song" Mary Ann.

United by that thought, Arquímides Gonzáles, Ediberto, Mary Ann Acevedo, Blanca Rosa, Jometh Andujar and Jonathan (ex-participants of Objetivo Fama), will be the protagonists of the musical-concert Los Favoritos: The Show (this show include acting, singing and many choreographies), which will be presented at the Centro de Bellas Artes Luis A. Ferré. This is the first musical-concert that Mary Ann will be participating officially, with a principal participation.

With them on stage will be his former teacher at the academy (Objetivo Fama), Francisco Zamora, who chose precisely the select group, taking as the main criterion "a connection of heart", which established with young people during their passage through the television programme. The event, in addition to music seeks to convey a message of hope and motivation to young people, will have a live orchestra under the direction of Guillermo Torres and choreography by Danny Lugo.

2009: Cántale a tu Bebé and Flow: El Musical

At the end of 2006, Mary Ann had reported that begin recording what would be her second album with the label "Univision Music Group", and that it would launch in mid-March and May 2008. This album will be produced and directed by Francisco Zamora and Mary Ann's husband, Guillermo Torres. Among the recordings of the long-awaited album, the house label sent a press release in which formalize the sale of the company, which will change at the hands of "Universal Music", which hit the singer. But all this has changed, Mary Ann, ended her contract with the label Universal Music, which implies that its two new albums will be released independently.

Along with her husband, producer Guillermo Torres, composed all the songs included on the album of lullabies, "Cántale a tu Bebé", it released on October 5, 2009. These are songs written for babies and reflect the sentiment of all mothers. Mary Ann says that is something beautiful and mothers, especially first time, like her, will enjoy it.

Mary Ann said, with "Cántale a tu Bebé" you can feel a comforting experience. It is important that when you share this moment with your child, do it with loving, clear voice, and also to transmit the teaching of communication early, you're preparing your mind to receive and identify the sound waves from the voice of Mom and Dad, which will reassure and create a more effective and pleasurable experience. Be sure to look for the perfect time to share with your child.

Must be when you are in the process of rest, the moment of waking from a nap or when you as a parent understand that your child is receptive to listening to music. Sing, and opportunity for the child to interact with you, ensure that he is attentive and active participant in the process. Your baby is born and want to share with you this new stage in life you start. Considering the importance of maintaining a distinctive tradition, and rescue the beautiful old customs, we come to you, Dad and Mom through this CD that is designed to enrich your baby's mind from the beginning. Here's an excellent selection of lullabies that stimulate the feelings between father, mother and baby, also contribute to a better emotional development in its growth stage.

Also, Mary Ann has a special participation in the musical "Flow: El Musical", this musical is an "urban" adaptation of the popular opera "Carmen"; it was presented at the Centro de Bellas Artes Luis A. Ferre on September 17. She was interpret the character of "Nica", she is that person who always carries a message at the most critical times, and makes you recognize on the inside and accept when you do something wrong. This musical also involved the singers "Auudi" (reggaetón) and Javier Baerga as well the model and TV presenter, Natalia Rivera and other artists.

2010–2011: Génesis and Idol Puerto Rico
In January 2010, Mary Ann Acevedo, published the name of the first single from her third studio album, produced by her husband, singer Guillermo Torres. This announcement was made from their website. The single entitled "Génesis" is one of the songs that make the new studio album from Mary Ann "El Amor es la Solución", who was scheduled to go on sale in the month of February 2010, but the date was changed to mid April 2010, then GT Music announced the release of the album was cancelled. The song "Genesis", composed by Guillermo Venegas Lloveras, is a classic of Latin music, with this song the legendary singer Lucecita Benítez, better known as "La Voz Nacional de Puerto Rico", won the Festival de la Canción Latina (Mexico) in 1969. "Genesis" released on June 18, 2010 for digital download through iTunes.

In May 2011, Mary Ann auditioned in Hiram Bithorn Stadium to belong to the reality show, Idol Puerto Rico. At the first casting, Acevedo sang the song "Que Lastima" by Lourdes Robles, she passed to the second round being part of the 80 pre-selected. In her second casting (which was divided into two presentations), she sang "No Te Mentia" and then the song "Recuerdame" with Luis Xavier Zayas (participant of Idol Puerto Rico). Mary Ann officially entered to the competition as one of 24 semi-finalists. On August 4, 2011, Mary Ann got through to the finals as part of the 12 participants who were striving to be the next idol. The announcement was made live on the entertainment program "SuperXclusivo" where the finalists were named with their families in the audience.

On September 5 was the First Live Concert for the participants of the reality show, where Acevedo played the song "Aprenderé" by Ednita Nazario, receiving good reviews from the jury. However, Mary Ann had been going through a controversy as public opinion was that she had more experience than the other contestants because of her involvement in Objetivo Fama and the fact that she recorded three albums as a professional singer with a music label, as well as performing with other singers, headlining concerts in Puerto Rico and being a guest artist for awards shows which were advantages other contestants did not have. On September 15 was the Second Live Concert and Mary Ann was awarded good reviews for her performance with the song "Todos Me Miran" by Gloria Trevi. On September 19 which was the Third Live Concert, Mary Ann received the best reviews of the jury, but was eliminated as she merited the fewest votes from the public. She became the second participant eliminated from the competition.

2012–present: Third studio album, Génesis
Officially, on January 1, 2012, Mary Ann released her third studio album, "Génesis". This album is the comeback of Mary Ann to the music. After her pregnancy, her album of lullabies and being a contestant in the reality show Idol Puerto Rico, Mary Ann took more time to delay the album's release. It was thought that the album would be called "El Amor es la Solución" (Love is the Solution), but apparently "Genesis" proved to be a more commercial and more welcoming to the public as the first single from the CD is titled the same way. Genesis is an album that portrays the influence of Mary Ann, including covers of songs that the public has known in the voices of Rocio Durcal, Celine Dion, Mariah Carey and other singers. In addition, Mary Ann includes a new version of the song "Todo para Mi", featuring the jazz flautist Néstor Torres; song that is on her first album with the title "Todo Eres Tú". Besides this production integrates the merengue version of "Mírame".

Musical influences
For Mary Ann, music and being a singer is more than having a career in which he dedicates his life to doing what he loves. That way has been influenced by several Puerto Rican artists. Marc Anthony, is a key component in the evolution of Mary Ann as a professional singer, has grown with his music and in the future she wants to meet him and also do a duet with him. Among Mary Ann's many achievements was: being proclaimed as "La Voz de Puerto Rico", being an ambassador for this title as Lucecita Benítez, who is known as "La Voz Nacional de Puerto Rico". In 2006, her album "Mary Ann" became the 2nd best-selling album in Puerto Rico. Acevedo, has been privileged by being able to share a stage with Alejandra Guzmán, Guillermo Dávila, Luis Enrique and Víctor Manuelle Mary Ann and Víctor Manuelle joined their voices in the "KQ105 Concert" and "Sistema102 in Concert". Mary Ann was as a guest artist at the "Premios Lo Nuestro" and also participated in the Christmas compilation album "Navidad Boricua: Mi Pueblo esta de Fiesta".

Discography

Studio albums
 2006: Mary Ann
 2009: Cántale a tu Bebé
 2012: Génesis

Other albums
 2006: Con tus Estrellas En Vivo
 2007: Navidad Boricua: Mi Pueblo esta de Fiesta
 2008: Tu Favorito

Filmography

See also

List of Puerto Ricans
Mary Ann (disambiguation)

References

1987 births
Interamerican University of Puerto Rico alumni
Living people
People from Cabo Rojo, Puerto Rico
21st-century Puerto Rican women singers
Idols (franchise) participants
Women in Latin music